Francisco "Patxi" Puñal Martínez (born 6 September 1975) is a Spanish retired footballer who played as a defensive midfielder.

The vast bulk of his professional career was connected with Osasuna, where he was often charged with penalty-taking and for which he appeared in 513 competitive matches.

Club career
Born in Huarte, Navarre, Puñal played his entire professional career with CA Osasuna save for two on-loan seasons with Madrid's CD Leganés, in Segunda División. His first official game for the first team came on 15 June 1997 in a 1–1 away draw against SD Eibar, in the same tier.

After his loan spell, Puñal returned as an undisputed first choice, scoring his first La Liga goal on 27 October 2001 at already 26, in a 4–0 home win over RCD Mallorca. In Osasuna's 2005–06 historical league campaign, which brought a best ever fourth-place finish, he netted four in 34 matches.

On 29 November 2006, as the side went on to reach the last-four in the UEFA Cup easily beating teams like Bayer Leverkusen, Parma, Girondins de Bordeaux or Glasgow Rangers., Puñal scored three times (one in his net) in a 3–1 home defeat of Odense Boldklub in the group stage. He made 47 official appearances that season.

From 2007 to 2010, veteran Puñal continued to figure prominently for Osasuna, featuring in exactly 100 league games – scoring twice through penalties, in a 2–0 win at Getafe CF and a 1–2 home loss to Real Madrid, both goals coming during 2007–08 – and also being the captain after the retirement of César Cruchaga. During that timeframe, he was booked a total of 37 times.

Puñal finished 2012 on a high note, being a father for the first time and having appeared in a total of 470 competitive matches for his main club, a best-ever. He obtained the record after his 464th overall appearance on 21 October, against Real Betis, and on 26 May 2013 he again entered the team's history books, netting from 30 meters and contributing to a 2–1 home victory over Sevilla FC which certified permanence in the top division for another year, with one game remaining.

Merits
 List of La Liga players (400+ appearances)
 In 2014, the Government of Navarra awarded him the Gold Medal for Sporting Merit of Navarra, the highest sporting award granted in the Government of Navarra.

References

External links

1975 births
Living people
Spanish footballers
Footballers from Navarre
Association football midfielders
La Liga players
Segunda División players
Segunda División B players
Tercera División players
CA Osasuna B players
CA Osasuna players
CD Leganés players
Basque Country international footballers